Rice Lake is a lake in Rice County, in the U.S. state of Minnesota.

Rice Lake was named for the abundant wild rice growing on the lake.

See also
List of lakes in Minnesota

References

Lakes of Minnesota
Lakes of Rice County, Minnesota